Loughmore-Castleiney is an ecclesiastical parish in the Roman Catholic Archdiocese of Cashel and Emly. It is located in County Tipperary, Ireland. The area is made up of the villages of Loughmore and Castleiney and their hinterland. Loughmore is situated approximately 1 kilometer from the N62 road approximately halfway between the towns of Templemore and Thurles. Castleiney is approximately 3 kilometers from Templemore. 

The GAA club Loughmore-Castleiney GAA is based in the parish. It has traditionally been associated with gaelic football but also has a hurling team.

Parishes of the Roman Catholic Archdiocese of Cashel and Emly